"Feelin'" is the final single by the La's from their debut album, released on 4 February 1991.

Music video
The music video contains the same live performance footage as the "Timeless Melody" video clip. The video ends with the camera freezing its scope on the band.

Formats and track listings
 All songs written by L.A. Mavers.
7" single (GOLAS 6)
Cassette single (LASMC 6)
 "Feelin'" – 1:50
 "Doledrum" – 2:52

7" EP (GOLAB 6)
 "Feelin'" – 1:50
 "I.O.U." (alternate version) – 2:09
 "Feelin'" (alternate version) – 2:04
 "Doledrum" – 2:52

12" single (GOLAS 612)
CD single (LASCD 6)
 "Feelin'" – 1:50
 "Doledrum" – 2:52
 "I.O.U." (alternate version) – 2:09
 "Liberty Ship" – 2:30

Personnel
The La's
 Lee Mavers – guitar, vocals
 John Power – bass, backing vocals
 Peter "Cammy" Camell – guitar
 Neil Mavers – drums
 Barry Sutton – guitar (on "I.O.U" alternate version)
 Chris Sharrock – drums (on "I.O.U" alternate version)
 Iain Templeton – drums (on "Feelin'" alternate version)

Production
 Steve Lillywhite – producer, mixing
 Mark Wallis – additional producer, engineer
 Dave Charles – engineer
 Mike Hedges – producer (on "I.O.U" alternate version)
 Ian Grimble – engineer, mixing (on "I.O.U" alternate version)
 John Leckie – producer (on "Feelin'" alternate version)
 Barry Hammond – engineer (on "Feelin'" alternate version)
 Mike Shepherd – engineer (on "Feelin'" alternate version)

Other personnel
 Ryan Art – design

Chart performance

References

External links
Official music video

1991 singles
The La's songs
Go! Discs singles
Song recordings produced by Steve Lillywhite
Songs written by Lee Mavers
1990 songs